Statistics of Primera División Uruguaya for the 1994 season.

Overview
It was contested by 13 teams, and Peñarol won the championship.

Apertura

Clausura

Overall

Playoff
Peñarol 1-1 ; 1-1 ; 2-1 Defensor Sporting
Peñarol won the championship.

References
Uruguay - List of final tables (RSSSF)

Uruguayan Primera División seasons
Uru
1994 in Uruguayan football